μClinux is a variation of the Linux kernel, previously maintained as a fork, that targets microcontrollers without a memory management unit (MMU). It was integrated into the mainline kernel as of 2.5.46; the project continues to develop patches and tools for microcontrollers. The homepage lists Linux kernel releases for 2.0, 2.4 and 2.6 (all of which are end-of-life in mainline).

The letters "μC" are for "microcontroller": the name is pronounced "you-see-Linux", rather than pronouncing the letter mu as in Greek.

History 
μClinux was originally created by D. Jeff Dionne and Kenneth Albanowski in 1998. Initially, they targeted the Motorola DragonBall family of embedded 68k processors (specifically the 68EZ328 series used in the Motorola PalmPilot) on a 2.0.33 Linux kernel. After releasing their initial work, a developer community quickly sprang up extending their work to newer kernels and other microprocessor architectures. In early 1999, support was added for the Motorola (now NXP) ColdFire family of embedded microprocessors. ARM processor support was added later.

Although originally targeting 2.0 series Linux kernels, it now has ports based on Linux 2.4 and Linux 2.6. The Linux 2.4 ports were forward ported from the 2.0.36 Linux kernel by Michael Leslie and Evan Stawnyczy during their work at Rt-Control. There were never any μClinux extensions applied to the 2.2 series kernels.

Since version 2.5.46 of the Linux kernel, the major parts of μClinux have been integrated with the mainline kernel for a number of processor architectures.

Greg Ungerer (who originally ported μClinux to the Motorola ColdFire family of processors) continued to maintain and actively push core μClinux support into the 2.6 series Linux kernels. In this regard, μClinux is essentially no longer a separate fork of Linux.

μClinux had support for many architectures, and forms the basis of many products, like network routers, security cameras, DVD or MP3 players, VoIP phone or gateways, scanners, and card readers.

Support for several of the original target architectures was dropped in 2018. The obsolete CPU architectures set to be removed in Linux 4.17 and subsequent releases included ADI Blackfin, Etrax CRIS, Fujitsu FR-V, Mitsubishi M32R, Matsushita/Panasonic MN10300, Imagination META (Metag), and Tilera TILE.

Supported architectures 
The current list includes:
 Altera Nios/Nios II
 Amber (open FPGA core)
 ARM ARM7TDMI, ARM Cortex-M3/M4/M7, ARM Cortex-R
 Lattice Mico32
 NXP 680x0 (Motorola/Freescale 680x0)
 Hyperstone E1/E2 (called hyLinux)
 Intel i960
 MIPS
 NXP ColdFire (Motorola/Freescale ColdFire)
 NEC V850E
 Xilinx MicroBlaze

No longer supported 

 Hitachi/Renesas H8 (h8300) - removed in Linux 5.19.

Before Linux 4.17 the following architectures were also supported:
 ADI Blackfin (blackfin)
 Axis ETRAX (cris)
 Fujitsu FR-V (frv)
 Mitsubishi/Renesas M32R (m32r)

References

External links 
 

 μClinux at SourceForge
 
 Accelerated Linux, an actively developed continuation of μClinux-dist by Digi

ARM operating systems
Embedded Linux
Embedded operating systems
Lightweight Unix-like systems
Linux kernel